The Archdiocese of Mercedes-Luján is a Latin Church ecclesiastical territory or archdiocese of the Catholic Church in north-central Buenos Aires Province, Argentina. It was immediately subject to the Holy See, coming into 2019. Erected as the Diocese of Mercedes on 20 April 1934, it was renamed as the Diocese of Mercedes-Luján on 10 May 1989 and elevated to its status as an archdiocese on 21 November 1997. Its mother church is the Catedral Basílica de Mercedes-Luján in Mercedes.

On 4 March 2019, Pope Francis raised it to a metropolitan archdiocese, with three suffragan dioceses within its ecclesiastical province. The suffragan dioceses are Merlo-Moreno, Nueve de Julio, and Zárate-Campana.  The first had been in the Buenos Aires province, and the other two were in the La Plata province. Francis also appointed the first metropolitan archbishop, Jorge Eduardo Scheinig, who had been titular bishop of Ita.

Bishops

Ordinaries
Juan Pascual Chimento (1934–1938), appointed Archbishop of La Plata
Anunciado Serafini (1939–1963)
Luis Juan Tomé (1963–1981)
Emilio Ogñénovich (1982–2000)
Rubén Héctor di Monte (2000–2007)
Agustín Roberto Radrizzani, SDB (2007–2019)
Jorge Eduardo Scheinig (2019–present)

Auxiliary bishops
Vicente Alfredo Aducci (1960–1962)
Herberto Celso Angelo (1990–1993)
Oscar Domingo Sarlinga (2003–2006), appointed Bishop of Zárate-Campana
Jorge Eduardo Scheinig (2017–2019), appointed Archbishop here

Other priests of this diocese who became bishops
Antonio Quarracino, appointed Bishop of Nueve de Julio in 1962; future Cardinal
Eduardo Francisco Pironio, appointed Auxiliary Bishop of La Plata in 1964; future Cardinal

Territory
The archdiocese serves fifteen partidos in Buenos Aires Province:

Alberti Partido
Carmen de Areco Partido
Chacabuco Partido
Chivilcoy Partido
General Las Heras Partido
General Rodríguez Partido
Junín Partido
Leandro N. Alem Partido
Lobos Partido
Luján Partido
Marcos Paz Partido
Mercedes Partido
Navarro Partido
San Andrés de Giles Partido
Suipacha Partido

References

External links
Archdiocese of Mercedes-Luján

Roman Catholic dioceses in Argentina
Roman Catholic Ecclesiastical Province of Mercedes-Luján
Christian organizations established in 1934
Roman Catholic dioceses and prelatures established in the 20th century
1934 establishments in Argentina